Transport in Burkina Faso consists primarily of road, air and rail transportation. The World Bank classified country's transportation as underdeveloped but noted that Burkina Faso is a natural geographic transportation hub for West Africa.

Highways 

In 2000, the Government of Burkina Faso classified 15,000 kilometers of road as part of the national road network managed under the Ministry of Infrastructures Transport and Housing (MITH) through the Directorate of Roads (DGR). This network includes main inter-city roads and access roads for départments' capital cities.  Only ten of the network's main roads are even partially paved, and the paved roads are plagued by dangerous potholes, missing signage, missing barriers and guardrails near roadside hazards, and no pavement markings to separate traffic moving in opposite directions.

As of May 2011 the country's road infrastructure was rated by the World Bank to be in relatively good condition and noted that country was regional hub with paved roads linking the country to Mali, Ivory Coast, Ghana, Togo, and Niger. Nevertheless, "trucking cartels and red tape contribute to high transportation costs and diminished international competitiveness."  58% of firms in Burkina Faso identified roads as major business constraint, maintenance and rehabilitation needs of the main road network are said to be underfunded.

Air transport

There are international airports at Ouagadougou and Bobo-Dioulasso and numerous smaller airfields. In 2004, the number of airports totaled 23, only 2 of which had paved runways as of 2005. Air Burkina, which began in 1967, is government-run and has a monopoly on domestic service but also flies to neighboring countries.

Ouagadougou airport handles about 98% percent of all scheduled commercial air traffic in Burkina Faso. Air Burkina and Air France handle about 60% of all scheduled passenger traffic. Between 2005 and 2011, air passenger traffic at Ouagadougou airport grew at an average annual rate of 7.0 percent per annum reaching about 404,726 passengers in 2011 and was estimated to reach 850,000 by 2025. In 2007 Ouagadougou airport was the fifteenth busiest airport in West Africa in passenger volume, just ahead of Port Harcourt (Nigeria) and behind Banjul (Gambia). The total air cargo at Ouagadougou airport grew 71% from 4,350 tons in 2005 to about 7,448 tons in 2009.

The government plans to close the Ouagadougou airport upon construction of the new Ouagadougou-Donsin Airport, approximately 35 km northeast of Ouagadougou. The new airport is expected to be completed around 2018 and the government received an $85 million loan from the World Bank to help finance the construction. The government of Burkino Faso believed that the project would cost $618 million.

Railways 

There are 622 kilometres of railway in Burkina Faso, of which 517 km run from Ouagadougou to Abidjan, Ivory Coast; and 105 km from Ouagadougou to Kaya. As of June 2014 Sitarail operates a passenger train three times a week along the route from Ouagadougou to Abidjan via Banfora, Bobo-Dioulasso and Koudougou.

Only Ivory Coast is connected to Burkina Faso by rail.

Instability in Ivory Coast in 2003 forced a rerouting of rail freight from the Abidjan corridor to ports in Togo, Benin, and Ghana via the road network. A proposed rail link between Ouagadougou and Pô in Burkina Faso and Kumasi and Boankra in Ghana, has been discussed with Ghanaian officials, and feasibility studies are being undertaken to explore this possibility, which would provide rail access to the inland port of Bonakra. Burkina Faso and Ghana use different rail gauges and this break-of-gauge can be overcome to a greater or lesser extent with a number of methods.

In 2006, an Indian proposal surfaced to link the railways in Benin and Togo with landlocked Niger and Burkina Faso.  Additionally, a Czech proposal also surfaced to link Ghana railways with Burkina Faso.  The manganese deposits near Dori are one source of traffic.  Burkina Faso would also be a participant in the AfricaRail project.

In May, 2011 the World Bank reported that Sitarail had recovered well from the political crisis in Ivory Coast but was experiencing financial distress, needed to re-balance its financial structure and find alternative funding for rehabilitation backlog.

Stations served 

The following towns of Burkina Faso are served by the country's railways:
 Banfora
 Bobo-Dioulasso
 Koudougou
 Ouagadougou - national capital
 Kaya - terminus

See also 
 West Africa Regional Rail Integration

References

External links
 UN Map of Burkina Faso